Pallifera is a genus of air-breathing land slugs, terrestrial pulmonate gastropod mollusks in the family Philomycidae.

Species
Species include:

Pallifera costaricensis (Mörch, 1857) 
Pallifera dorsalis (Binney, 1842) – pale mantleslug
 Pallifera fosteri – Foster mantleslug   
 Pallifera hemphilli – black mantleslug   
 Pallifera marmorea – marbled mantleslug   
 Pallifera megaphallica – woody mantleslug   
 Pallifera ohioensis – redfoot mantleslug   
 Pallifera pilsbryi – Arizona mantleslug   
 Pallifera ragsdalei – whiteface mantleslug   
 Pallifera secreta – severed mantleslug   
 Pallifera tournescalis – Ouachita mantleslug   
 Pallifera varia – variable mantleslug

Cladogram
A cladogram based on sequences of cytochrome-c oxidase I (COI) genes showing phylogenic relations of genera in the family Philomycidae by Tsai & Wu (2008) (simplified):

Arion and Deroceras were used as outgroup.

References

External links
 LifeDesks, Terrestrial Slugs Web

Philomycidae
Gastropod genera